Tibble v. Edison International, 575 U.S. 523 (2015), was a United States Supreme Court case in which the Court held that "because a fiduciary normally has a continuing duty to monitor investments and remove imprudent ones, a plaintiff may allege that a fiduciary breached a duty of prudence by failing to properly monitor investments and remove imprudent ones. Such a claim is timely as long it is filed within six years of the alleged breach of continuing duty."

Opinion of the Court 
Associate Justice Stephen Breyer authored the unanimous opinion of the Court.

References

External links
 
 SCOTUSblog coverage

United States Supreme Court cases
United States Supreme Court cases of the Roberts Court
2015 in United States case law